Yannick Marchand may refer to:

 Yannick Marchand (Belgian footballer), Belgian football full-back
 Yannick Marchand (Swiss footballer), Swiss football midfielder